Benjamin Bathurst may refer to:

Sir Benjamin Bathurst (courtier) (c. 1639–1704), MP for Bere Alston & New Romney, Cofferer of the Household, British East India Company's governor
Benjamin Bathurst (politician, born 1692) (1692–1767), MP for Cirencester, 1713–1727, Gloucester 1727–1754, and Monmouth, 1754–1767; younger brother of the 1st Earl Bathurst
Benjamin Bathurst (1711–1767), MP for Gloucestershire, 1734–1741, and Cirencester, 1754–1761
Benjamin Bathurst (diplomat) (1784–1809?), British diplomat who disappeared in 1809; third son of Henry Bathurst, Bishop of Norwich
Benjamin Bathurst (politician, born 1872) (1872–1947), MP for Cirencester in 1895–1906 and 1910–18; third son of sixth Earl Bathurst
Benjamin Bathurst, 2nd Viscount Bledisloe (1899–1979), British barrister
Sir Benjamin Bathurst (Royal Navy officer) (born 1936), First Sea Lord, 1993–1995; grandson of the MP for Cirencester above
Sir Ben Bathurst (born 1964), British general, son of the Royal Navy officer above

See also
 Earl of Bathurst

  Benjamin Bathurst was born c1635. He was baptized 3rd Oct 1638.